
This is a list of aircraft in numerical order of manufacturer followed by alphabetical order beginning with 'Mo'.

Mo

Mohawk 
(Mohawk Aero Corp (Pres: Leon A Dahlem), 2639 Delaware St SE, Minneapolis, MN)
 Mohawk Cabin
 Mohawk M1C-K Pinto
 Mohawk Redskin
 Mohawk M1C-W Spurwing
 Mohawk M-2-C Chieftain
 Mohawk MLV Pinto
 Mohawk PT-7

Mohme 
( (Leo) Mohme Aero Engr Corp, 108 Church St, New Brunswick, NJ)
 Mohme A-1
 Mohme A-2
 Mohme A-3
 Mohme MVP Sport A

Mohr 
(Fred Mohr, Riceville, IA)
 Mohr 1928 Monoplane

Moineau
(René Moineau)
 Moineau C1
 Moineau pusher

Moinicken 
(Chris Moinicken, Webster and Aberdeen, SD)
 Moinicken 1924 Biplane

Moiseenko
(V.L.Moiseenko)
 V.L.Moiseenko 2U-B3

Moisant
 Moisant L'Ecrevisse Monoplane

Moles & Kerr 
(Howard R Moles & Jhn A Kerr, Kenmore, NY)
 Moles & Kerr 1931 Monoplane

Moller 
((Paul) Moller Aircraft Co, Davis, CA)
 Moller M150 Skycar
 Moller M200 Neuera
 Moller M200X Skycar
 Moller M200G Volantor
 Moller M400 Skycar
 Moller M600 Skycar
 Moller XM-2
 Moller XM-3
 Moller XM-4

Möller 
(Flugzeugbau Möller)
 Möller Stormarn
 Möller Stomo 1
 Möller Stomo 2
 Möller Stomo 3 (V-3 Temperolus, V-11 Stürmer)
 Möller Stromer

Mollo-Imoden 
(Ernest Mollo & Emil Imoden, Napa, CA)
 Mollo-Imoden 1936 Biplane

Molniya
(NPO Molniya)
Molniya-1
Molniya-100
Molniya-300
Molniya-400
Molniya-1000
Molniya Heracles

Molteni
(Ernesto Molteni)
 Molteni monoplane

Molyneux 
(G. C. Molyneaux, Melbourne, Australia)
 Molyneux XM-1000
 Molyneux XM2001

Monarch 
(Monarch Aircraft Corp (founders: Frank Stahle & Arthur W Roza), 94 Ogden Ave, Riverside, IL)
 Monarch A
 Monarch Commercial a.k.a. Light Commercial

Monarch 
(Monarch Aero Products, Cleveland, OH)
 Monarch F-130-2

Moncassin
 Moncassin single-engined flying boat
 Moncassin twin-engined flying boat

Mong 
(Ralph E Mong, Tulsa OK.)
 Mong MS1 Sport
 Mong Mongster

Monnereau 
(Gilbert Monnereau)
 Monnereau MG.01

Monnett 
((John T) Monnett Experimental Aircraft Inc, Elgin, IL)
 Monnett Sonerai
 Monnett Sonerai II
 Monnett Sonerai II-L
 Monnett Sonerai II-LS
 Monnett Sonerai II-LST
 Monnett Sonerai II-LT
 Monnett Monex
 Monnett Moni
 Monnett Mini-Moni
 Monnett Mini

Mono 
(Mono Aircraft Div (Pres: W L Velie), Allied Aviation Industries Inc)
 Mono Midget
 Mono Monocoach 201
 Mono Monocoach 225
 Mono Monocoupe 1
 Mono Monocoupe 70
 Mono Monocoupe 90
 Mono Monocoupe 110
 Mono Monocoupe 110 Special
 Mono Monocoupe 113
 Mono Monocoupe 113 Special
 Mono Monocoupe 125
 Mono Monocoupe 501
 Mono Monoprep 218
 Mono Monosport 1
 Mono Monosport 2

Monocoupe 
(Monocoupe Corp/Lambert Engine & Machine Corp, Lambert Field, St Louis, MO)
 Monocoupe 70-V
 Monocoupe 90
 Monocoupe 100 Special
 Monocoupe 110
 Monocoupe 125
 Monocoupe D
 Monocoupe D-125
 Monocoupe D-145
 Monocoupe Meteor
 Monocoupe Monosport D
 Monocoupe Monosport G
 Monocoupe Monocoach H a.k.a. Zenith / Zephyr
 Universal L-7

Mono-Van 
(Mono-Van Aircraft Inc (Pres: Eber H Van Valkenburg), 1202 Prospect Ave, Toledo and Fremont, OH)
 Mono-Van M-V-1
 Mono-Van M-2

Monsted-Vincent 
((Robert) Monsted-(H Farley) Vincent, New Orleans, LA)
 MV-1 Starflight small passenger aircraft, four pusher engines

Montagne 
(William Montagne, San Ramon, CA)
 Montagne Mach Buster

Montague 
( (M L) Montague Monoplane Company, Kansas City, KS)
 Montague Monoplane

Montalva 
 Montalva M.1 Montalva
 Montalva M.2 Trovão Azul

Montana 
(Montana Coyote Inc, Helena, MT)
 Montana Coyote
 Montana Mountain Eagle

Monte-Copter 
(Monte-Copter Inc (Fdr: Maurice L Ramme) Seattle, WA)
 Monte-Copter 10-A
 Monte-Copter 12
 Monte-Copter 15 Tri-phibian

Montee 
( Montee Aircraft Co, Santa Monica, CA)
 Montee 1921 Monoplane
 Montee Dragonfly
 Montee MR-1
 Montee N-2
 Montee Special

Montgomerie Autogyros 
 Montgomerie Bensen
 Montgomerie Merlin

Montgomery 
(John J Montgomery, Santa Clara, CA)
 Montgomery Double Monoplane

Montijo 
(John G Montijo, 2322 Elm St, Long Beach, CA)
 Montijo 1924 Biplane

Mooney 
 Mooney A-1
 Mooney A-2
 Mooney M-5
 Mooney M-10
 Mooney M-16C
 Mooney M-17 (Culver V)
 Mooney M-18 Mite
 Mooney M-19
 Mooney M-20
 Mooney MT20
 Mooney M22
 Mooney M-30
 Mooney MU-2
 Mooney M20
 Mooney 201
 Mooney Cadet
 Mooney TX-1

Mooney Mite Aircraft Corporation 
 Mooney Mite

Moragon 
(Aeromoragon)
 Moragon Stela

Morane-Saulnier 
(Léon Morane et Raymond Saulnier / Société Anonyme des Aéroplanes Morane-Saulnier / SEEMS – Société d'Exploitation des Etablissements Morane Saulnier / )
 Morane-Saulnier Torpille Blindée
 Morane-Saulnier 1912 Hydravion
 Morane-Saulnier A
 Morane-Saulnier AC
 Morane-Saulnier AE
 Morane-Saulnier AF
 Morane-Saulnier AFH
 Morane-Saulnier AI
 Morane-Saulnier AN
 Morane-Saulnier ANL
 Morane-Saulnier ANR
 Morane-Saulnier ANS
 Morane-Saulnier AR
 Morane-Saulnier AS
 Morane-Saulnier AV 1922 4-place parasol prototype
 Morane-Saulnier B
 Morane-Saulnier BB
 Morane-Saulnier BH
 Morane-Saulnier BI
 Morane-Saulnier C
 Morane-Saulnier F
 Morane-Saulnier G
 Morane-Saulnier GA
 Morane-Saulnier GB
 Morane-Saulnier G hydravion
 Morane-Saulnier H
 Morane-Saulnier I
 Morane-Saulnier K floatplane racer, monoplane
 Morane-Saulnier L
 Morane-Saulnier LA
 Morane-Saulnier M
 Morane-Saulnier N
 Morane-Saulnier O 1914 single seater, development of G prototype
 Morane-Saulnier P
 Morane-Saulnier PP (1911)
 Morane-Saulnier S
 Morane-Saulnier T
 Morane-Saulnier U
 Morane-Saulnier V
 Morane-Saulnier WB (confusion with Cyrillic script?)
 Morane-Saulnier WR
 Morane-Saulnier X
 Morane-Saulnier Y
 Morane-Saulnier TRK (MoS-9)
 Morane-Saulnier MoS-1 (C.1)
 Morane-Saulnier MoS-2 (G)
 Morane-Saulnier MoS-3 (L)
 Morane-Saulnier MoS-4 (LA)
 Morane-Saulnier MoS-5 (N)
 Morane-Saulnier MoS-5 C1
 Morane-Saulnier MoS-6 (I)
 Morane-Saulnier MoS-7 (BB)
 Morane-Saulnier MoS-8 (BH)
 Morane-Saulnier MoS-9 (TRK)
 Morane-Saulnier MoS-10 (S)
 Morane-Saulnier MoS-11 (R1/A)
 Morane-Saulnier MoS-12 (H)
 Morane-Saulnier MoS-13 (M)
 Morane-Saulnier MoS-14 (GB)
 Morane-Saulnier MoS-15 (GB)
 Morane-Saulnier MoS-16 (E.2 two seat trainer)
 Morane-Saulnier MoS-17 (G)
 Morane-Saulnier MoS-18 (G)
 Morane-Saulnier MoS-19 (GA).
 Morane-Saulnier MoS-23
 Morane-Saulnier MoS-25
 Morane-Saulnier MoS-27
 Morane-Saulnier MoS-28
 Morane-Saulnier MoS-29
 Morane-Saulnier MoS-30
 Morane-Saulnier MoS-35
 Morane-Saulnier MS.42
 Morane-Saulnier MoS-43
 Morane-Saulnier MoS-50
 Morane-Saulnier MoS-51
 Morane-Saulnier MoS-53
 Morane-Saulnier MoS-69
 Morane-Saulnier MoS-121
 Morane-Saulnier MoS-130
 Morane-Saulnier MoS-132
 Morane-Saulnier MoS-133
 Morane-Saulnier MoS-134
 Morane-Saulnier MoS-136
 Morane-Saulnier MoS-137
 Morane-Saulnier MoS-138
 Morane-Saulnier MoS-139
 Morane-Saulnier MS.140
 Morane-Saulnier MoS-147
 Morane-Saulnier MoS-148
 Morane-Saulnier MoS-149
 Morane-Saulnier MS.129
 Morane-Saulnier MS.152
 Morane-Saulnier MS.180
 Morane-Saulnier MS.181
 Morane-Saulnier MS.185
 Morane-Saulnier MS.191
 Morane-Saulnier MS.200
 Morane-Saulnier MS.221
 Morane-Saulnier MS.222
 Morane-Saulnier MS.223
 Morane-Saulnier MS.224
 Morane-Saulnier MS.225
 Morane-Saulnier MS.226
 Morane-Saulnier MS.227
 Morane-Saulnier MS.229
 Morane-Saulnier MS.230
 Morane-Saulnier MS.231
 Morane-Saulnier MS.232
 Morane-Saulnier MS.233
 Morane-Saulnier MS.234
 Morane-Saulnier MS.234/2
 Morane-Saulnier MS.234no2
 Morane-Saulnier MS.235
 Morane-Saulnier MS.236
 Morane-Saulnier MS.237
 Morane-Saulnier MS.260
 Morane-Saulnier MS.275
 Morane-Saulnier MS.278
 Morane-Saulnier MS.300
 Morane-Saulnier MS.301
 Morane-Saulnier MS.311
 Morane-Saulnier MS.315
 Morane-Saulnier MS.315/2
 Morane-Saulnier MS.316
 Morane-Saulnier MS.317
 Morane-Saulnier MS.325
 Morane-Saulnier MS.340
 Morane-Saulnier MS.341
 Morane-Saulnier MS.342
 Morane-Saulnier MS.343
 Morane-Saulnier MS.345
 Morane-Saulnier MS.350
 Morane-Saulnier MS.405
 Morane-Saulnier MS.406
 Morane-Saulnier MS.410
 Morane-Saulnier MS.430
 Morane-Saulnier MS.435
 Morane-Saulnier MS.450
 Morane-Saulnier MS.470 Vanneau
 Morane-Saulnier MS.471 Vanneau
 Morane-Saulnier MS.472 Vanneau
 Morane-Saulnier MS.473 Vanneau
 Morane-Saulnier MS.474 Vanneau
 Morane-Saulnier MS.475 Vanneau
 Morane-Saulnier MS.476 Vanneau
 Morane-Saulnier MS.477 Vanneau
 Morane-Saulnier MS.478 Vanneau
 Morane-Saulnier MS.479 Vanneau
 Morane-Saulnier MS.500 Criquet
 Morane-Saulnier MS.501
 Morane-Saulnier MS.502
 Morane-Saulnier MS.504
 Morane-Saulnier MS.505
 Morane-Saulnier MS.506
 Morane-Saulnier MS.540
 Morane-Saulnier MS.560
 Morane-Saulnier MS.561
 Morane-Saulnier MS.562
 Morane-Saulnier MS.563
 Morane-Saulnier MS.564
 Morane-Saulnier MS.570
 Morane-Saulnier MS.571
 Morane-Saulnier MS.572
 Morane-Saulnier MS.600
 Morane-Saulnier MS.602
 Morane-Saulnier MS.603
 Morane-Saulnier MS.660
 Morane-Saulnier MS.661
 Morane-Saulnier MS.700
 Morane-Saulnier MS.701
 Morane-Saulnier MS.703 Pétrel
 Morane-Saulnier MS.704
 Morane-Saulnier MS.730 Alcyon
 Morane-Saulnier MS.731 Alcyon
 Morane-Saulnier MS.732 Alcyon
 Morane-Saulnier MS.733 Alcyon
 Morane-Saulnier MS.733A Alcyon
 Morane-Saulnier MS.735 Alcyon
 Morane-Saulnier MS.755 Fleuret
 Morane-Saulnier MS.760 Paris
 Morane-Saulnier MS.880 Rallye
 Morane-Saulnier MS.880b Rallye
 Morane-Saulnier MS.885 Super Rallye
 Morane-Saulnier MS.886 Rallye
 Morane-Saulnier MS.890 Rallye Commodore
 Morane-Saulnier MS.893
 Morane-Saulnier MS.894 Rallye Commodore
 Morane-Saulnier MS.1500 Épervier

Moreau
(Albert Moreau)
 Moreau 1909 monoplane

Morava Zlin
 Morava (Russo) Savage

Moreau
(Jean Moreau)
 Moreau 10

Moreland 
((G E) Moreland Aircraft Inc, Mines Field, El Segundo, CA)
 Moreland M-1
 Moreland MT-101
 Moreland S-3

Morgan 
(Morgan Aircraft)
 Morgan Bushmaster II

Morin 
(Pierre Morin)
 Morin PM.1

Morita 
(Shinzo Morita)
 Morita 1911 Aeroplane

Mörkö 
 Mörkö Moraani

Morris 
(Kenneth G Morris)
 Morris KM-II Spare Parts

Morris 
(Roy Morris Aircraft Co, Topeka, KS)
 Morris Dove

Morrisey 
((William J) Morrisey Aircraft Co, Long Beach and Santa Ana, CA, 1959: (Clifford) Shinn Aircraft Co, Santa Ana, CA, c.1982: The Morrisey Co, San Luis Rey, CA, 1984: Morrisey Aircraft Co, Las Vegas, NV)
 Morrisey 1000C Nifty
 Morrisey 2000C
 Morrisey 2150
 Morrisey Bravo I Primary
 Morrisey Bravo II aka MO-1-2
 Morrisey OM-1

Morrison Aircraft 
(Nambour, Queensland, Australia)
Morrison 6

Morrissette 
(Everett T Morrissette, Somers, CT)
 Morrissette Mosquito

Morrow 
((Howard B) Morrow Aircraft Corp, San Bernardino, CA)
 Morrow 1-L Victory Trainer

Morse 
(Allen Morse, 3337 Pincrest Rd, Indianapolis, IN)
 Morse Comet
 Morse 1935 Biplane

Mortensen/Rutan 
(Dan Mortensen – builder / Burt rutan – designer)
 Mortensen/Rutan Racer

Morton 
(Morton Brothers Airplanes, Omaha and McCook, NE)
 Morton Nightingale

Moryson
(Josef Moryson or Morison / Morrison)
 Moryson Ostrovia I
 Moryson Ostrovia II
 Moryson III
 Moryson IV

Morton 
(Aviation Industries Inc, Omaha, NE)
 Morton f.s.b.

Moser 
 Moser helicopter

Mosca-Bystritsky 
(Francesca E. Mosca & Bystritsky)
 Mosca-Bystritsky MB
 Mosca-Bystritsky MB Encore
 Mosca-Bystritsky MBbis

Moshier
(Moshier Technologies)
 Moshier Aurora 400A

Moskalyev 
 Moskalyev RM-1
 Moskalyev MU-3
 Moskalyev SAM-1
 Moskalyev SAM-2
 Moskalyev SAM-3
 Moskalyev SAM-4
 Moskalyev SAM-5
 Moskalyev SAM-6
 Moskalyev SAM-7 Sigma
 Moskalyev SAM-9 Strela
 Moskalyev SAM-10
 Moskalyev SAM-11
 Moskalyev SAM-11bis
 Moskalyev SAM-12
 Moskalyev SAM-13
 Moskalyev SAM-14
 Moskalyev SAM-16
 Moskalyev SAM-18bis
 Moskalyev SAM-19
 Moskalyev SAM-22
 Moskalyev SAM-23
 Moskalyev SAM-24
 Moskalyev SAM-25
 Moskalyev SAM-26
 Moskalyev SAM-28
 Moskalyev SAM-29

Mosler 
(Mosler Motors Inc, Hendersonville NC.)
 Mosler N3 Pup
 Mosler N3-2

Mosquito 
(Mosquito Aviation)
 Mosquito Aviation XE
 Mosquito Aviation AIR
 Mosquito Aviation XEL
 Mosquito Aviation XE3
 Mosquito Aviation XET

Moth 
(Moth Aircraft Corp, Lowell, MA)
(N.B. not related to American Moth)
 Moth 60-GM
 Moth 60-GMW
 Moth 60-X

Motor Products 
(designer William B Stout)
 Motor Products SX-6

Moundsville 
(Moundsville Airplane Corp, Moundsville, WV)
 Moundsville Lone Eagle X2LC

Mountaineer 
(Christopher Morgan, New York, NY)
 Mountaineer 1912 Biplane

Mountaineer Trikes 
Mountaineer Trikes Mite-Lite
Mountaineer Trikes Dual 175
Mountaineer Trikes Solo 175

Moscow Technical School 
 ITU 1911 monoplane (A.N. Tupolev, B.N. Yuryev and A.A. Komarov)
 Lobanov L-1 Ptenets (fledgeling) (Nikolai Rodionovich Lobanov)
 Dukhovetskii D-1 Liliput (A.V. Dukhovetskii)
 Dukhovetskii D-2 Malyi Muromets

Mosscraft 
(Moss Brothers Aircraft)
 Mosscraft M.A.1
 Mosscraft M.A.2

Moura 
(Mauricio Impelizieri P.Moura)
 MIM Esqualo-180 (Shark)

Mourlot 
 Mourlot X-28

Moyer 
(Jarrett G Moyer, Syracuse and Skaneateles, NY)
 Moyer 1928 Monoplane

Moyes Delta Gliders 
(Botany and later Kurnell, New South Wales, Australia)
 Moyes CXS
 Moyes GTR
 Moyes Litespeed
 Moyes Litesport
 Moyes Malibu
 Moyes Max
 Moyes Mega
 Moyes Mission
 Moyes Sonic
 Moyes Ventura
 Moyes X2
 Moyes XL
 Moyes XS
 Moyes XT
 Moyes Xtralite

Moyes Microlights 
 Moyes Connie
 Moyes Dragonfly
 Moyes Dragonfly C
 Moyes Tempest

Moynet 
 Moynet M-360 Jupiter

Mozhaiski
 Mozhaiski Monoplane

References

Further reading

External links 

 List of Aircraft (M)

fr:Liste des aéronefs (I-M)